Nuestras Hijas de Regreso a Casa A.C. ("May Our Daughters Return Home, Civil Association") 
is a non-profit organization composed of mothers, family members, and friends of victims of the female homicides in Ciudad Juárez. The mothers claim that their cases have gone unsolved in some cases for over 12 years.  Their hope is to get the murderers of their daughters arrested and hopefully convicted.

Founding and purpose
The organization was co-founded by Norma Andrade, mother of Lilia Alejandra Garcia Andrade, who was kidnapped on February 14, 2001, and found dead 10 days later. The other founder of NHRC is Marisela Ortiz Rivera, Lilia's high school teacher turned activist. Many of the victims have been found to be poor working mothers employed in factories in Ciudad Juárez, which is located in the northwestern Mexican state of Chihuahua, and is located across the Rio Grande from the U.S. city of El Paso, Texas. Since 1993, female bodies have been found in the City of Juarez, and most of the cases remain unsolved. The group's mission is to put pressure on the Mexican government to fight impunity, solve the murders and counter-act the prevalence of femicide.

Reception and danger
Norma Andrade was shot at 5 times in an attempt to silence her. As  prominent advocate and President and co-founder of NHRC, her and other women live in danger in Ciudad Juarez. The group is controversial as some politicians want the outrage and discourse to die down but the women continue to disappear, year after year. NHRC is an intersectional feminist group in Mexico that is the voice for the problematic subject that is the "Women of Juarez." The group says they will not stop fighting for the respect and dignity of the disappeared and murdered in Ciudad Juarez also known as Feminicidios. The group is composed of mothers of the victims of Femicide and continues to fight together and advocate for The Women of Juarez.

Prevalence of femicide
According to Amnesty International, as of February 2005 more than 600 bodies had been found and over 800 women were still missing. In November 2005, BBC News reported Mexico's human rights ombudsman Luis Raúl González Pérez as saying that 28 women had been murdered so far in 2005.

In the media
Nuestras Hijas de Regreso a Casa group was worked with filmmaker Zulma Aguiar on a Juarez Documentary titled "Juarez Mothers Fight Femicide," which was filmed in 2005.

In January 2010, UK Television News program Channel 4 News broadcast a report from Ciudad Juarez in which a young girl told how she had been abducted by a gang of men and forced into prostitution. She told the program's reporter Nick Martin how she had witnessed girls being murdered by the gang and how children were abducted and sold to order to American citizens. The report was recognized by the Foreign Press Association as TV News Story of the Year in 2010 and prompted US Immigration & Customs Enforcement to launch a cross border investigation into the women's claims.

Femicide in Mexican law
In Mexico, femicide is typified in the Federal Penal Code in Article 325, from June 14, 2012, to the letter, defines this crime as:

"ARTICLE 325.- The crime of femicide is committed by one who deprives a woman of life for gender reasons. Gender reasons are considered to exist when any of the following circumstances exist:

References

External links
 

Political organizations based in Mexico
Human rights in Mexico